Eucosmophora pithecollobiae is a moth of the family Gracillariidae. It is known from Belize and from Florida in the United States.

The length of the forewings is 3-3.9 mm for males and 3.3–4 mm for females.

The larvae feed on Pithecollobium guadalupense, Pithecollobium macrandrium and Pithecollobium unguis-cati. They mine the leaves of their host plant. The initial serpentine track is often obliterated by the blotch fashioned by third instar larva. The upper surface of the mine is waxy translucent. The larva remains visible within the mine throughout its development. Portions of the upper mine surface are discolored by the liquidy frass excreted by the sap-feeding instars. The larva removes patches of parenchyma from the floor of the mine, especially about the periphery. The dark green frass is concentrated along the edges of the mine.

Etymology
The species name is derived from the generic name, Pithecellobium, of the larval host plant.

References

Acrocercopinae
Moths described in 2005